Alec Marsh Albiston (16 November 1917 – 13 April 1998) was an Australian rules footballer who played with Hawthorn in the Victorian Football League (VFL) and with North Melbourne for his final season. A goalkicking rover, he was captain and coach of Hawthorn between 1947 and 1949.

Playing career

Albiston was small in stature and a fitness fanatic. He took great pride in being able to run out a game. One of his personal aims was to run as fast in the last quarter as he had in the first and his remarkable durability ensured he never missed a game through injury. This fitness base saw him play many brilliant and tenacious games as a rover. He was very skilful and was constantly named in the press reports amongst the best players afield. 

He was the first Hawthorn player in the history of the club to kick 10 goals in a match, doing so against North Melbourne in the opening round of the 1940 season. His season ended shortly afterwards after the board suspended him indefinitely during a dispute between his brother (Harold Albiston) and a committeeman.

In 1941 he was back, winning the club best and fairest and was the club's leading goalkicker.  Albiston joined the Air Force in 1942 when he was at his football prime and was one of the favorites to win the Brownlow Medal in 1942.

Albiston won the Hawthorn best and fairest award again in 1946. He topped the Hawks' goalkicking charts four times during his career, in 1939, 1941, 1942 and 1945.

In 1947 Albiston was appointed Captain-coach of Hawthorn for three years, while he enjoyed the position he said that the club was hamstrung for the ability to recruit good players. The club had no budget for recruiting.

Albiston was involved in a nasty off season split at Hawthorn in 1949; Albiston had accepted that he would not be coaching in 1950, but a committeeman had promised him the captaincy, whereas Bob McCaskill had wanted Kevin Curran as captain and this caused a huge internal fight. Brownlow Medallist Col Austen sided with Albiston, but the committee sided with the new coach and Albiston and Austen were given open clearances; Albiston to North Melbourne and Austen to Richmond. With the loss of its best two players, Hawthorn finished 1950 in last without a win.

Albiston played seven games for the Shinboners before retiring.

When he left Hawthorn he was the clubs greatest goalkicker with 383 goals, he held that record until the end of 1964 when John Peck passed him.

In 2011 he was inducted into the Hawthorn Football Club Hall of Fame.

Honours and achievements
Individual
 2× Hawthorn best and fairest: 1941, 1946
 4× Hawthorn leading goalkicker: 1939, 1941, 1942, 1945
 Hawthorn captain: 1947–1949
 Hawthorn Hall of Fame
 Hawthorn life member

References

Sources
 Blair, L. (2005) The Immortals, John Wiley & Sons: Brisbane. .

External links

1917 births
1998 deaths
Australian rules footballers from Victoria (Australia)
Peter Crimmins Medal winners
Hawthorn Football Club players
Hawthorn Football Club coaches
North Melbourne Football Club players
Kew Football Club players
People from Warrnambool